Alli Mia Fora (Greek: Άλλη μια φορά) is the third album by Greek musical group Antique.  The album was released in November 2002 by V2 Records and it became gold in Greece, their first album to do so. In 2003, many of the songs from this album were included in English on their Swedish release titled Blue Love.

Track listing

Singles
"Alli Mia Fora"
The first single from the album was "Alli Mia Fora". The music video was directed by Kostas Kapetanidis. It was released as an English version called "Time to Say Goodbye" on their follow-up album Blue Love

"Moro Mou"
The second single from the album was "Moro Mou". A mixed Greek and English version was released from Blue Love called "Moro Mou (My Baby)".

External links 
info-grece.com
Lyrics

Antique (band) albums
2003 albums
Greek-language albums
V2 Records albums